Avé is a 2011 Bulgarian drama film directed by Konstantin Bojanov. The film is Bojanov's narrative film debut. His first film was a documentary about heroin users in Sofia.

Cast
 Anjela Nedyalkova as Ave
 Ovanes Torosian as Kamen
 Martin Brambach as Truck-driver
 Svetla Yancheva as Viki's Mother
 Bruno S. as Viki's Grandfather

Awards
In 2011, Avé won the Special Jury Prize at the Sarajevo Film Festival.

References

External links
 

2011 films
2010s Bulgarian-language films
2011 drama films
2011 directorial debut films
Bulgarian drama films